The Zhangzhou dialects, also rendered Changchew, Chiangchew or Changchow, are a collection of Hokkien dialects spoken in southern Fujian province (in southeast China), centered on the city of Zhangzhou.

Classification
The Zhangzhou dialects are classified as Hokkien, a group of Southern Min varieties. In Fujian, the Zhangzhou dialects form the southern subgroup of Southern Min. The dialect of urban Zhangzhou is one of the oldest dialects of Southern Min, and along with the urban Quanzhou dialect, it forms the basis for all modern varieties. When compared with other varieties of Hokkien, it has an intelligibility of 89.0% with the Amoy dialect and 79.7% with the urban Quanzhou dialect.

Phonology
This section is mostly based on the variety spoken in the urban area of Zhangzhou.

Initials
There are 15 phonemic initials:

Rimes
There are 85 rimes:

Tones
There are seven tones:

Most people in the urban area do not pronounce the dark level tone as high-level, but slightly mid-rising. While most sources still records this tone as 44, its tone value has also been recorded as 24, 45, 34 or 35 to reflect its rising nature.

Tone sandhi
The Zhangzhou dialect has nine tone sandhi rules: only the last syllable of nouns and clause endings remain unchanged by tone sandhi. The two-syllable tone sandhi rules are shown in the table below:

Notes

References
 
 
 
 
 
 
 
 
 
 
 
 
 
 

Fujian
Hokkien-language dialects
Zhangzhou